James Vincent Tate (December 8, 1943 – July 8, 2015) was an American poet.  His work earned him the Pulitzer Prize and the National Book Award. He was a professor of English at the University of Massachusetts Amherst and a member of the American Academy of Arts and Letters.

Biography
Tate was born in Kansas City, Missouri, where he lived with his mother and his grandparents in his grandparents' house. His father, a pilot in World War II, had died in combat on April 11, 1944, before Tate was a year old. Tate and his mother moved out after seven years when she remarried. The eventual poet said he belonged to a gang in high school and had little interest in literature. He planned on being a gas station attendant as his uncle had been, but finding that his friends to his surprise were going to college, he applied to Kansas State College of Pittsburg (now Pittsburg State University) in 1961. Tate wrote his first poem a few months into college with no external motivation; he observed that poetry "became a private place that I was hugely drawn to, where I could let my daydreams—and my pain—come in completely disguised. I knew from the moment I started writing that I never wanted to be writing about my life." In college he read Wallace Stevens and William Carlos Williams and was "in heaven". He received his B.A. in 1965, going on to earn his M.F.A. from the University of Iowa's famed Writer's Workshop. During this period he was finally exposed to fellow poets and he became interested in surrealism, reading Max Jacob, Robert Desnos, and André Breton; for Benjamin Péret he expressed particular affection. Of poets writing in Spanish, César Vallejo "destroyed" him but he was not so taken by the lyricism or romanticism of Pablo Neruda or Federico García Lorca.

He was married to Dara Wier. Tate died on July 8, 2015 at the age of 71.

Career
Tate taught creative writing at the University of California, Berkeley, Columbia University, and at the University of Massachusetts Amherst, where he worked from 1971 until his death in 2015.  He was a member of the poetry faculty at the MFA Program for Poets & Writers, along with Dara Wier and Peter Gizzi.

Dudley Fitts selected Tate's first book of poems, The Lost Pilot (1967), for the Yale Series of Younger Poets while Tate was still a student at the Writers' Workshop; Fitts praised Tate's writing for its "natural grace."  Tate's first volume of poetry, Cages, was published by Shepherd's Press, Iowa City, 1966.

Tate won the 1992 Pulitzer Prize and the Poetry Society of America's William Carlos Williams Award in 1991 for his Selected Poems. In 1994, he won the National Book Award for his poetry collection Worshipful Company of Fletchers.

Tate's writing style is often described as surrealistic, comic and absurdist. His work has captivated other poets as diverse as John Ashbery and Dana Gioia. Regarding his own work, Tate said, "My characters usually are—or, I’d say most often, I don’t want to generalize too much—but most often they’re in trouble, and they’re trying to find some kind of life." This view is supported by the poet Tony Hoagland's observation that "his work of late has been in prose poems, in which his picaresque speaker or characters are spinning through life, inquisitive and clueless as Candide, trying to identify and get with the fiction of whatever world they are in."

In addition to many books of poetry, he published two books of prose, Dreams of a Robot Dancing Bee (2001) and The Route as Briefed (1999).

Some of Tate's additional awards included a National Institute of Arts and Letters Award, the Wallace Stevens Award, and fellowships from the Guggenheim Foundation and the National Endowment for the Arts. He was also a Chancellor of the Academy of American Poets.

Published works

Full-length poetry collections
The Government Lake: Last Poems (Ecco Press, 2019)
Dome of the Hidden Pavilion (Ecco Press, 2015)
 The Eternal Ones of the Dream: Selected Poems 1990–2010 (Ecco Press, 2012)
 The Ghost Soldiers (Ecco Press, 2008)
 Return to the City of White Donkeys (Ecco Press, 2004)
 Memoir of the Hawk (Ecco Press, 2002)
 Shroud of the Gnome (Ecco Press, 1997)
 Worshipful Company of Fletchers: Poems (Ecco Press, 1994) — winner of the National Book Award
 Selected Poems (Wesleyan University Press, 1991) — winner of the Pulitzer Prize and the William Carlos Williams Award
 Distance from Loved Ones (Wesleyan University Press, 1990)
 Reckoner (Wesleyan University Press, 1986)
 Constant Defender (Ecco Press, 1983)
 Riven Doggeries (Ecco Press, 1979)
 Viper Jazz (Wesleyan University Press, 1976)
 Absences: New Poems (Little, Brown & Co., 1972)
 Hints to Pilgrims (Halty Ferguson, 1971)
 The Oblivion Ha-Ha (Little, Brown & Co., 1970)
 The Lost Pilot (Yale University Press, 1967)

Chapbooks
 The Zoo Club (Rain Taxi, 2011)
 Lost River (Sarabande Books, 2003)
 Police Story (Rain Taxi, 1999)
 Bewitched: 26 poems (Embers Handpress, Wales, illustration by Laurie Smith.)
 Just Shades (Parallel Editions, 1985, illustrated by John Alcorn)
 Land of Little Sticks (Metacom Press, 1981)
 Apology for Eating Geoffrey Movius’ Hyacinth (Unicorn Press, 1972)
 Amnesia People (Little Balkans Press, 1970)
 Wrong Songs (H. Ferguson, 1970)
 Shepherds of the Mist (Black Sparrow Press, 1969)
 Row with your Hair (Kayak Press, 1969)
 The Torches (Unicorn Press, 1968)
 Notes of Woe (Stone Wall Press, 1968)
 Cages (Shepherds Press, 1966)

Prose
 Dreams of a Robot Dancing Bee: 44 Stories (Verse Press, 2002)
 The Route as Briefed (University of Michigan Press, 1999)
 Hottentot Ossuary (Temple Bar Bookshop, 1974)

Collaborations
 Lucky Darryl (Release Press, 1977, a novel co-written with Bill Knott)
 Are You Ready, Mary Baker Eddy??? (Cloud Marauder Press, 1970, poems co-written with Bill Knott)

In anthologies
Tate's work has been included in The Best American Poetry series numerous times, including in
2010,
2008,
2006,
2005,
2004,
2003,
2001,
1998,
1997,
1994,
1993,
1991,
1990, and
1988;
his work was also in The Norton Anthology of Modern and Contemporary Poetry.

Honors and awards
In 2004, Tate was elected to the American Academy of Arts and Letters.

Other recognition has included:

 Pulitzer Prize for Poetry
 National Institute of Arts and Letters Award
 Guggenheim Fellowship
 National Endowment for the Arts Literature Fellowship in Poetry
 National Book Award for Poetry
 1995 Wallace Stevens Award
 Yale Series of Younger Poets

The James Tate International Poetry Prize
	
In Tate's honour, the  James Tate International Poetry Prize has been awarded by the international surrealist poetry magazine SurVision each year since 2018.

References

External links
 James Tate at the Academy of American Poets

 James Tate's Author Page at Wave Books
 Audio: James Tate reading at the Key West Literary Seminar, 2003
 Interview with James Tate from the University of Pennsylvania website
 James Tate's page at The University of Massachusetts' MFA Program for Poets & Writers
 James Tate on PennSound
 James Tate's website

American male poets
National Book Award winners
Pulitzer Prize for Poetry winners
Surrealist poets
Emerson College faculty
University of Massachusetts Amherst faculty
Iowa Writers' Workshop faculty
Iowa Writers' Workshop alumni
University of Iowa alumni
Pittsburg State University alumni
Columbia University faculty
Writers from Kansas City, Missouri
2015 deaths
Yale Younger Poets winners
1943 births
20th-century American poets
20th-century American male writers